The 2018 Australian Women in Music Awards is the inaugural Australian Women in Music Awards. The event took place on 10 October 2018.

Nominations for the awards were open until 12 July 2018 and finalists were announced on 3 September 2018.

Queensland Minister for Women, Di Farmer said "Women make up almost half of Australians with a music qualification and half of those studying music – yet only one-fifth of songwriters are women. Women hold only 28 per cent of senior and strategic roles in key industry associations and female artists earn less in general than their male counterparts. I congratulate the Australian Women in Music Awards committee for their work towards encouraging more girls and women in to the music industry."

AWMA Honour Roll
 Helen Reddy

Lifetime Achievement Awards
 Patricia Amphlett (Little Pattie), Renée Geyer & Margret RoadKnight.

Nominees and winners

AWMA Awards
Winners indicated in boldface, with other nominees in plain.

References

External links
 

2018 in Australian music
2018 music awards